ConeXpress was a concept orbital life extension vehicle project that was co-funded by ESA and Orbital Recovery Ltd.
The Ariane-5 interface cone structure would be the basis. ConeExpress satellites would travel to the Geostationary orbit, lock on to satellites that have run out of fuel and extend their lives. It was conceived to provide the operators of geostationary communications satellites with an opportunity to extend the revenue-earning life of select space assets by up to 10 years.

Docking

The onboard docking equipment consisted of a capture tool that inserts a probe into the throat of the apogee motor of the Client satellite, locks itself to the throat by expanding the crown of the probe, and pulls the Client satellite back towards it  by retracting the probe. This process is reversed for undocking.

Specifications
Shape: Conical
Base Dimension: 2.6m
Height: 0.9m
Power: Solar Panels
Solar Wing Span: 15m
Mass: 1400 kg
Propulsion: Ion Engines

ConeXpress Partners
Partners included:
Dutch Space
Arianespace
EADS CASA Espacio
Oerlikon Space
GMV
Kayser-Threde
DLR
NLR
Sener
Snecma Moteurs
Swedish Space Corporation

References

External links
https://archive.today/20121212001523/http://telecom.esa.int/telecom/www/object/index.cfm?fobjectid=17870
http://space.skyrocket.de/doc_sdat/conexpress-ors.htm

Proposed satellites